Lengefeld is a town and a former municipality in the district Erzgebirgskreis, in the Free State of Saxony, Germany. It is situated in the Ore Mountains, 23 km southeast of Chemnitz. On 1 January 2014 it was merged with the municipality Pockau to form the town Pockau-Lengefeld.

Sights 
 Lengefeld Lime Works Museum

References 

Former municipalities in Saxony
Pockau-Lengefeld